Daiwa may refer to:

Places:
Daiwa, Hiroshima, a former town in Kamo District, Hiroshima, Japan
Daiwa, Shimane, a former village in Ōchi District, Shimane, Japan

Companies and related:
Daiwa Securities Group, a Japanese security brokerage
Daiwa House, a Japanese homebuilder
The Daiwa Anglo-Japanese Foundation, a United Kingdom-based charity
Daiwa Adrian Prize, awarded by the Daiwa Anglo-Japanese Foundation
Globeride (formerly Daiwa Seiko Corporation), a Japanese producer of fishing and outdoor equipment
Daiwa Major, a Thoroughbred racehorse

See also
 Yamoto (disambiguation)